Harry Williams (1875 – after 1896) was an English professional footballer who played in the Football League for Small Heath.

Williams was born in Aston, which is now part of Birmingham, and played local football before joining Small Heath in April 1896. He made his debut in the Second Division on 13 March 1897, deputising for regular right back Frank Lester in a game at Lincoln City which Small Heath won 3–1. This was the only competitive first-team game that Williams played for the club before he returned to local football with Nechells.

References

1875 births
Year of death missing
Footballers from Birmingham, West Midlands
English footballers
Association football fullbacks
Aston Unity F.C. players
Birmingham City F.C. players
English Football League players
Date of birth missing
Place of death missing